The 2017 Louisiana Ragin' Cajuns football team represented the University of Louisiana at Lafayette in the 2017 NCAA Division I FBS football season. The Ragin' Cajuns played their home games at Cajun Field in Lafayette, Louisiana, and competed in the Sun Belt Conference. They were led by seventh-year head coach Mark Hudspeth. They finished the season 5–7, 4–4 in Sun Belt play to finish in a three-way tie for fifth place.

On December 3, the day following their final season game (a blowout lost against Appalachian State 63-14), head coach Mark Hudspeth was fired. He finished with a seven-year record of 51–38. However, due to NCAA sanctions in 2016 because former assistant coach David Saunders arranged fraudulent college entrance exams for recruits, his official record was 29–38. On December 15, the school hired Billy Napier as head coach.

Previous season 
The Ragin' Cajuns finished the 2016 season 6–7, 5–3 in Sun Belt play to finish in fifth place. They were invited to the New Orleans Bowl where they lost to Southern Miss.

Offseason

Recruiting class

Preseason

Award watchlists

Sun Belt Media Day

Predicted standings

Preseason All–Conference Team

Offensive
OL Kevin Dotson (Second Team)
WR Keenan Barnes (Third Team)
OL Robert Hunt (Third Team)
OL D'Aquin Withrow (Third Team)

Defense
DL Joe Dillon (First Team)
DB Tracy Walker (Third Team)

Specialists
K Stevie Artigue (First Team)

Roster

Schedule
Louisiana announced its 2017 football schedule on March 1, 2017. The 2017 schedule consisted of five home and seven away games in the regular season. The Ragin' Cajuns hosted Sun Belt foes Georgia Southern, Louisiana-Monroe, New Mexico State, and Texas State, and traveled to Appalachian State, Arkansas State, Idaho, and South Alabama

The Ragin' Cajuns hosted one of the four non-conference opponents, Southeastern Louisiana from the Southland Conference, and traveled to Tulsa from the American Athletic Conference and Southeastern Conference members Ole Miss and Texas A&M.
 

Schedule Source:

Game summaries

Southeastern Louisiana

at Tulsa

at Texas A&M

Louisiana–Monroe

at Idaho

Texas State

\

at Arkansas State

at South Alabama

at Ole Miss

New Mexico State

Georgia Southern

at Appalachian State

References

Louisiana
Louisiana Ragin' Cajuns football seasons
Louisiana Ragin' Cajuns football